The Renault MT is a compact sport car manufactured by Renault from 1923 until 1925.

Details and Evolutions

The Renault MT was presented in the 1923 Mondial de l'Automobile in Paris. The project was created and designed by Labourdette and Louis Renault together with the Renault KJ, as a middle-class car with an alternative style for 3 passengers. It was produced in Skiff or boat tail bodystyles. The Renault MT's front was very similar to the Renault KJ. Production ceased in 1924 as Renault replaced this model with the Renault NN.

Types
MT

Characteristics

Speed: 
Power: 15HP (6CV)

Type MT
Cars introduced in 1923